Yackandandah railway station is the closed terminus station of the closed Yackandandah line located in the northeastern Victorian town of Yackandandah. 
The station has been completely demolished but the former station site at Yackandandah has been used as a Council depot. Remains of the former platforms can still be made out.

Disused railway stations in Victoria (Australia)